Hichem Chérif El-Ouazzani (born 1 January 1996) is an Algerian professional footballer who currently plays as a midfielder. On January 31, 2019, Hichem Chérif El-Ouazzani was suspended for 4 years by the Algerian League's Discipline Commission due to doping affair.

Professional career
Chérif El-Ouazzani made his professional debut with MC Alger in a 2-1 Algerian Ligue Professionnelle 1 loss to RC Arbaâ 29 May 2015.

On 31 January 2019, El-Ouazzani was sentenced to a four-year suspension and a big fine after being tested positive for doping substances, including cocaine. However, he said that he did not intend to become doped when he smoked waterpipe with his friends on the eve of the match against the CR Belouizdad on 17 January. The player also assured that he did not know that the substances in question were mixed with tobacco. The test showed positive on methylergometrine and benzoylecgonine, which is the main metabolite of cocaine.

International career
Chérif El-Ouazzani made his debut for the Algeria national football team in a 1-1 2018 African Nations Championship qualification tie with Libya on 18 August 2017.

Personal life
Chérif El-Ouazzani is the son of the manager and former footballer Tahar Chérif El-Ouazzani.

References

External links
 
 
 

1996 births
Living people
Sportspeople from Oran
Algerian footballers
Algeria international footballers
Association football midfielders
MC Oran players
USM Oran players
MC Alger players
Algerian Ligue Professionnelle 1 players
21st-century Algerian people